Yasin Erdal (born May 30, 1986) is a Turkish-Dutch futsal player. He currently plays for LZV Marku Bouw and is a member of the Turkey national futsal team in the UEFA Futsal Championship.

References

External links 
 Player profile at club page

1986 births
Living people
Turkish men's futsal players
Dutch people of Turkish descent